Christian Meidlinger (born 5 September 1971) is an Austrian former cyclist. He competed at the 1992 Summer Olympics and the 1996 Summer Olympics.

References

External links
 

1971 births
Living people
Austrian male cyclists
Olympic cyclists of Austria
Cyclists at the 1992 Summer Olympics
Cyclists at the 1996 Summer Olympics
Cyclists from Vienna
20th-century Austrian people